Wandering Shadows is a 2004 Colombian drama film directed by Ciro Guerra. The film was selected as the Colombian entry for the Best Foreign Language Film at the 78th Academy Awards, but was not accepted as a nominee.

Plot 
Mañe is a man in a tough economic situation. He has lost a leg and as a result is stuck in unemployment, he does not have money for the lease and is the victim of jokes and abuse by the young people of his community. As he wanders in Bogota's streets looking for a source of income, he meets a strange and illiterate man, who is dedicated to carrying people on his back, on a chair, through the downtown.  Due to the way they can help each other, they engage in a curious friendship that makes their lives more bearable and allows them to share their personal problems. But both of them share a violent past as a product of the armed conflict. This past unites them and at the same time separates them, as men who have lost everything, except the hope of a new beginning.

See also
 List of submissions to the 78th Academy Awards for Best Foreign Language Film
 List of Colombian submissions for the Academy Award for Best Foreign Language Film

References

External links
 
 Profile at Proimágenes Colombia

2004 films
2004 drama films
2000s Spanish-language films
Colombian drama films
Films directed by Ciro Guerra